The 2022–23 UEFA Champions League group stage began on 6 September 2022 and ended on 2 November 2022. A total of 32 teams competed in the group stage to decide the 16 places in the knockout phase of the 2022–23 UEFA Champions League.

Eintracht Frankfurt made their debut appearance in the group stage, which was their first appearance in the European Cup since their loss in the 1960 final, after winning the 2021–22 UEFA Europa League and this is the first time that five German clubs played in the group stage.

A total of 15 national associations were represented in the group stage. This season was the first since the 1995–96 season in which a Turkish side failed to qualify for the group stage. It was also the first time since the 2007–08 season that two Scottish sides qualified for the group stage.

Draw
The draw for the group stage was held on 25 August 2022, 18:00 CEST (19:00 TRT), in Istanbul, Turkey. The 32 teams were drawn into eight groups of four. For the draw, the teams were seeded into four pots, each of eight teams, based on the following principles:
Pot 1 contained the Europa League title holders, and the champions of the top seven associations based on their 2021–22 UEFA country coefficients.
Pot 2, 3 and 4 contained the remaining teams, seeded based on their 2021–22 UEFA club coefficients.
Teams from the same association could not be drawn into the same group. Prior to the draw, UEFA formed pairings of teams from the same association (one pairing for associations with two or three teams, two pairings for associations with four or five teams) based on television audiences, where one team was drawn into Groups A–D and another team was drawn into Groups E–H, so that the two teams would play on different days. The following pairings were announced by UEFA after the group stage teams were confirmed:

 A  Real Madrid and Barcelona
 B  Eintracht Frankfurt and RB Leipzig
 C  Manchester City and Liverpool
 D  Milan and Napoli
 E  Bayern Munich and Borussia Dortmund
 F  Paris Saint-Germain and Marseille
 G  Porto and Benfica
 H  Chelsea and Tottenham Hotspur
 I  Juventus and Inter Milan 
 J  Atlético Madrid and Sevilla
 K  Rangers and Celtic

On each matchday, one set of four groups played their matches on Tuesday, while the other set of four groups played their matches on Wednesday, with the two sets of groups alternating between each matchday. The fixtures were decided after the draw, using a computer draw not shown to public. Each team would not play more than two home matches or two away matches in a row, and would play one home match and one away match on the first and last matchdays (Regulations Article 16.02). This arrangement was different from previous seasons, where the same two teams would play at home on the first and last matchdays.

Teams
Below are the participating teams (with their 2022 UEFA club coefficients), grouped by their seeding pot. They include:
26 teams which entered in this stage
6 winners of the play-off round (4 from Champions Path, 2 from League Path)

Notes

Format
In each group, teams played against each other home-and-away in a round-robin format. The top two teams of each group advanced to the round of 16. The third-placed teams are transferred to the Europa League knockout round play-offs, while the fourth-placed teams are eliminated from European competitions for the season.

Tiebreakers
Teams were ranked according to points (3 points for a win, 1 point for a draw, 0 points for a loss). If two or more teams were tied on points, the following tiebreaking criteria was applied, in the order given, to determine the rankings (see Article 17 Equality of points – group stage, Regulations of the UEFA Champions League):
Points in head-to-head matches among the tied teams;
Goal difference in head-to-head matches among the tied teams;
Goals scored in head-to-head matches among the tied teams;
If more than two teams were tied, and after applying all head-to-head criteria above, a subset of teams were still tied, all head-to-head criteria above were reapplied exclusively to this subset of teams;
Goal difference in all group matches;
Goals scored in all group matches;
Away goals scored in all group matches;
Wins in all group matches;
Away wins in all group matches;
Disciplinary points (direct red card = 3 points; double yellow card = 3 points; single yellow card = 1 point);
UEFA club coefficient.
Due to the abolition of the away goals rule, head-to-head away goals were no longer applied as a tiebreaker starting from last season. However, total away goals were still applied as a tiebreaker.

Groups
The fixtures were announced on 27 August 2022, two days after the draw. The matches were played on 6–7 September, 13–14 September, 4–5 October, 11–12 October, 25–26 October and 1–2 November 2022. The scheduled kick-off times were 18:45 (two matches on each day) and 21:00 (remaining six matches) CET/CEST.

Times are CET/CEST, as listed by UEFA (local times, if different, are in parentheses).

Group A

Group B

Group C

Group D

Group E

Group F

Group G

Group H

Notes

References

External links

Group Stage
2022-23
September 2022 sports events in Europe
October 2022 sports events in Europe
November 2022 sports events in Europe